Joy Jibrilu is a government official and attorney in The Bahamas. Jibrilu is the Director General of The Bahamas Ministry of Tourism & Aviation. From 2008 to 2014 Jibrilu was the Director of Investments in the Bahamas Investment Authority (BIA) in the Office of the Prime Minister.

References 

Living people
Bahamian civil servants
Year of birth missing (living people)